V.5 is the tenth mixtape by American rapper Lloyd Banks, was released on December 28, 2009 for free download.

Background 
The mixtape featured guest appearances by Havoc and Cormega on the track "Greenday" and his G-Unit labelmate Tony Yayo on "No Escape".

The song "Rather Be Me" uses a sample from Indian composer A. R. Rahman's "Bombay Theme" (1995). In 2014, the beat from "Greenday" was used by 50 Cent for his new song "Chase The Paper" which featured guest appearances by Kidd Kidd, Styles P and Prodigy on the Animal Ambition album.

Track listing

References

External links
Download

2009 mixtape albums
2009 compilation albums
Lloyd Banks albums
Sequel albums